Smirnovs is the Latvian-language form of the Russian surname Smirnov. Notable people with the surname include:
Andris Smirnovs, Latvian professional cyclist
Deniss Smirnovs, Latvian professional ice hockey player
Georgijs Smirnovs, Latvian footballer and football manager
Māris Smirnovs (born 1976), Latvian footballer 
Vitālijs Smirnovs, Latvian footballer

See also

Latvian-language surnames

lv:Smirnovs